Berlin-Plänterwald is a railway station in the Treptow-Köpenick district of Berlin.

Notable places nearby
Archenhold Observatory
Treptower Park
Spreepark
Soviet War Memorial (Treptower Park)

References

Berlin S-Bahn stations
Railway stations in Treptow-Köpenick
Railway stations in Germany opened in 1956